was a Japanese swimmer. She competed in the 100 m freestyle event at the 1932 Olympics, but was eliminated in the preliminaries.

On 29 August 1933 Matsuzawa set a national record in the 50 m freestyle at 31.06 seconds that stood until 21 August 1954. In 1934 she became a high school teacher, and in 1936 a national swimming coach at the Berlin Olympics. She married in 1937 and later had five children, including Sadahiko Sugaya, who became president and CEO of TV Tokyo. She returned to swimming in 1984, and between 1986 and 2000 competed at national and world masters championships.

References

1914 births
2011 deaths
Japanese female freestyle swimmers
Swimmers at the 1932 Summer Olympics
Olympic swimmers of Japan
People from Maizuru